David Evans Wood (December 10, 1823June 17, 1862) was an American lawyer, judge, and politician.  He died of disease while serving as a Union Army colonel in the American Civil War.

Background 
Wood was born in Beaver County, Pennsylvania, in 1823. He was a college graduate and had practiced law before he came to Wisconsin, about 1848. He first settled in Manchester (later renamed "Brothertown").

Legislature 
He was elected in 1849 to serve a one-year term as a member of the Wisconsin State Assembly, representing Calumet County in the 3rd Wisconsin Legislature in 1850. He was a Whig, and succeeded Alonzo D. Dick (also a Whig). He was not re-elected in 1850, and was succeeded by Democrat William H. Dick.

Fond du Lac and war 
In 1851 he moved to Fond du Lac County, where he practiced law. He served as probate judge of Fond du Lac County from 1854-57. Upon the outbreak of the American Civil War, in the fall of 1861 he enlisted and became colonel of the 14th Wisconsin Infantry Regiment. The 14th Wisconsin was raised at Fond du Lac, under Wood; the camp in Fond du Lac where they trained was renamed "Camp Wood," after him. The 14th Wisconsin was mustered into Federal service on January 30, 1862. They fought at the Battle of Shiloh, earning much praise and the nickname "the Wisconsin Regulars." Wood was injured during the battle. He contracted an unspecified disease in the South, returned home and died of fatigue and disease on June 17, 1862.

References

External links 
 

|-

Wisconsin Whigs
Wisconsin lawyers
People from Calumet County, Wisconsin
People from Fond du Lac, Wisconsin
Members of the Wisconsin State Assembly
Probate court judges in the United States
Union Army colonels
United States politicians killed during the Civil War
People of Wisconsin in the American Civil War
19th-century American politicians
1823 births
1862 deaths